Allen, Alan  or Alun Owen may refer to:

Allen Ferdinand Owen (1816–1865), American legislator and lawyer 
Alun Owen (1925–1994), Welsh writer and actor
Alan Owen (1928–2011), English composer and radio producer
Alun Owen (cyclist) (born 1965), Welsh cyclist
 Alan Ernest Owen (1928–1999), English physicist

See also
Owen (surname)